Ana Vilma Albanez de Escobar is a Salvadoran female politician who was Vice President of El Salvador from 1 June 2004 to 1 June 2009. She is a member of the right-wing Nationalist Republican Alliance (ARENA) party.

She is the first woman to serve as vice president, complementing the presidential formula of Elías Antonio Saca for the term 2004–2009. Their victory was the outcome of the most attended election in Salvadoran history, giving their party, ARENA, 58.5% of the votes, 20 points above its closest contender. She sought the nomination for president of El Salvador in the presidential primary of 2008 but was defeated by National Police Chief Rodrigo Ávila.

Education and experience

She earned a degree in economics from the "José Simeón Cañas" Central American University additionally she has pedagogical experience in the areas of mathematics and languages. She is fluent in both English and French.

De Escobar worked for ten years at the United States Agency for International Development in its Private Sector Office managing projects to develop the promotion of non-traditional exports and to foment foreign investment through the private and public sector.

Her participation in Salvadoran politics includes serving as executive director of the political party ARENA and Director of the Women's Sector of the Party. She was a candidate for congress in the 2003 elections.

Governance 

Within the government had the task of leading the efforts to create jobs through the Foreign Direct Investment Promotion Agency ‘’'PROESA'’(by its Spanish acronym) and Export Promotion Agency EXPORTA, was electedPresident of the National Agency for the Promotion of Exports (EXPORTA).

In her management developed the conception and launch of the National Export Strategy in force until 2016, the strategic investment attraction for the integration of the textile industry and clothing, and attracting investment in the services sector, especially in Contact and Distribution and Logisticscenters.

She also developed a plan to convert El Salvador into a regional hub, with the goal of modernizing the country.

De Escobar was also president of the National Commission for Sustainable Development (CNDS). The CNDS works with the United Nations Development Programme, international organizations, and government institutions responsible of carrying out national social programs.

Legislative candidacy

On 20 May 2011 was published his nominations a candidate for legislator to the Legislative Assembly of El Salvador by the department of San Salvador, under the Nationalist Republican Alliance (ARENA).

One difference from previous years in the elections, are the reforms in electoral laws, the ballot for the election of deputies, will show the faces of the candidates. Ana Vilma began in December 2011 a campaign called Defend your vote and the main campaign promise is your work plan is the commitment to the country's growth in all sectors.

On Sunday 11 March 2012, the country was under elections, after scrutiny by the Supreme Electoral Tribunal of El Salvador was announced that Ana Vilma de Escobar received 135.015 votes, these results became the candidate for Congress of party Arena in San Salvador with more preference votes received by face. De Escobar will hold deputy in charge of San Salvador in the period 2012–2015 in the Salvadoran parliament.

References

External links 
 website
 Investment Promotion Agency of El Salvador PROESA
 EXPORTA El Salvador

1954 births
Living people
Nationalist Republican Alliance politicians
Vice presidents of El Salvador
21st-century Salvadoran women politicians
21st-century Salvadoran politicians
Women vice presidents
Central American University alumni
21st-century Algerian people